TSS Sir Richard Grenville was a passenger tender vessel built for the Great Western Railway in 1931.

History

TSS Sir Richard Grenville was built by Earle's Shipbuilding and Engineering Company in Hull and launched on 18 June 1931. She was a replacement for the ship of the same name dating from 1891. She was one of a pair built for tendering duties in Plymouth harbour, her sister TSS Sir John Hawkins being launched two years later.

During World War II she was used by the Admiralty at Plymouth, Scapa Flow and Pentland Firth.

After returning to railway service early in 1946 she resumed service at Plymouth until 31 October 1963, the last tender in use at that dock.

She eventually found a new owner and was renamed La Duchesse de Normandie for services around the Channel Islands. She was sent for scrapping in 1969.

References

1931 ships
Passenger ships of the United Kingdom
Steamships of the United Kingdom
Ships built on the Humber
Ships of the Great Western Railway
Ships of British Rail